Tejero may refer to:
Antonio Tejero (1932-), Spanish former Lieutenant Colonel of the Guardia Civil, and the most prominent figure in the failed coup d'état ('Tejerazo') of 23 February 1981
Álvaro Tejero (born 1996), Spanish footballer
Delhy Tejero (1904 – 1968), Spanish painter
Fernando Tejero (born 1967), Spanish actor